Zhangxin (张新) may refer to:

Zhangxin, Anhui, a town in Linquan County, Anhui, China
Zhangxin Subdistrict, a subdistrict in Hengshan District, Jixi, Heilongjiang, China

See also
Zhang Xin (disambiguation) for people